The Los Angeles River, historically known as Paayme Paxaayt (West River) by the Tongva and the Porciúncula River (Río Porciúncula) by the Spanish, is a major river in Los Angeles County, California. While the river was once free-flowing and frequently flooding, forming alluvial flood plains along its banks, it is currently notable for flowing through a concrete channel on a fixed course, which was built after a series of devastating floods in the early 20th century.

Before the opening of the Los Angeles Aqueduct, the river was the primary source of fresh water for the city. Although the Los Angeles region still receives some water from the river and other local sources, most of the water supply flows from several aqueducts serving the area. The Los Angeles River is heavily polluted from agricultural and urban runoff.

Fed primarily by rainwater and snowmelt (in winter and spring), the Donald C. Tillman Water Reclamation Plant in Van Nuys (in summer and fall), and urban discharge, it is one of the few low-elevation perennial rivers in Southern California. Some water usually reaches the ocean, even in the driest summers; although there are historical accounts of the river running dry, there has been constant flow of the river every month since recording of stream flow began in 1929. This is helped by the concrete channel, which limits absorption of water into the earth. Flow, while generally low in volume, can be extremely brisk even in summer.

Course

Bell Creek flows east from the Simi Hills, and Arroyo Calabasas flows north from the Santa Monica Mountains. From there the river flows east through a concrete flood control channel and very soon receives Browns Canyon Wash, which flows south from the Santa Susana Mountains. The river then bends slightly south and receives Aliso Canyon Wash, whose watershed adjoins that of Browns Canyon. The river then flows through the district of Winnetka, then Reseda and enters the Sepulveda Basin, a flood-control reservoir formed by the Sepulveda Dam.

As the river proceeds into the usually-dry reservoir, it spills out into a channel that is similar to its historical, non-channeled form. It crosses under Balboa Boulevard and then receives Bull Creek. The river then passes through the outlet works of Sepulveda Dam,  from the mouth. It flows again into a concrete channel and crosses under Interstate 405 as it passes through Van Nuys, Sherman Oaks, and Studio City, still flowing east. Paralleling U.S. Highway 101 briefly, it then veers southeast, away from the highway, and receives from the left the Tujunga Wash, one of its largest tributaries, which flows southwest and south from the Angeles National Forest in the San Gabriel Mountains. The river then rounds a bend to the northeast, now in a concrete box culvert, and crosses under State Route 170 and Highway 101, and receives Burbank Western Channel on the left bank,  from the mouth.

The river then begins to parallel California State Route 134 as it winds through North Hollywood and the city of Burbank. It then crosses under Interstate 5 and makes a sharp bend to the south-southeast as it curves around Griffith Park. It receives from the left Verdugo Wash, which drains much of La Cañada Flintridge and Glendale as it flows from the San Gabriel Mountains south through a water gap in the Verdugo Mountains, and crosses under State Route 134. Here, the river begins to flow over a natural riverbed, but enters another concrete section soon after. Paralleling Interstate 5 for the next few miles, the river runs by the eastern side of Griffith Park and the Harding-Wilson Golf Course. It passes Silver Lake Reservoir, which is to the right, and crosses under California State Route 2,  from the mouth.

Making two meanders as it flows in a southeasterly direction, the river parallels the interstate and Riverside Drive then crosses under the interstate and California State Route 110 as it flows east of Elysian Park. It then receives the Arroyo Seco, another major tributary, from the left. The river flows south past the Mission Junction, a large railroad yard on the left. It enters a wider concrete channel with sloped sides, and crosses under Cesar Chavez Avenue, Highway 101, and Interstate 10 as it passes east of downtown Los Angeles, flowing past the East Los Angeles Interchange for Highway 101, California State Route 60, and Interstates 5 and 10 on the left. It then makes a gradual turn east and then turns southeast, flowing a few miles before it begins to parallel Interstate 710 near Maywood, Bell, Cudahy, and Commerce,  from the mouth.

Paralleling Interstate 710 south-southwest, the river then crosses under former California State Route 42 and the interstate as it receives the Rio Hondo from the left,  from the mouth. The Rio Hondo ("deep river") now serves as a distributary for the San Gabriel River to the east via the Whittier Narrows Reservoir. The river then crosses under I-105 and shifts slightly southwest, then flows east of Compton and west of Bellflower. After crossing under California State Route 91, it receives Compton Creek from the right,  from the mouth. After crossing under Interstate 405 for the second time,  from the mouth, it draws close to the Dominguez Channel to the west and flows due south to its outlet in Long Beach, under Interstate 710, past the RMS Queen Mary, and into the Port of Long Beach.

History

Until the opening of the Los Angeles Aqueduct in 1913, the Los Angeles River was the main water source for the Los Angeles Basin. The river ran dry during the summers and flooded during winter months. Indigenous communities adapted to the climate surrounding the river, maximizing agricultural yields by rerouting the natural flow of the river and constructing water wheels along the river. 

The river provided water and food to the Tongva people, hunters and gatherers who lived primarily off fish, small mammals, and the acorns from the abundant oak trees along the river's path. There were at least 45 Tongva villages near the Los Angeles River, concentrated in the San Fernando Valley and the Elysian Valley, in what is present-day Glendale. After the Spanish established Mission San Gabriel in 1771, they referred to the Tongva living in that mission's vicinity as Gabrieleño.

Alta California 

In 1769, members of the Portolá expedition to explore Alta California were the first Europeans to see the river. On August 15, the party camped near the river, somewhere along the stretch just to the north of what is now the Interstate 10 crossing near downtown Los Angeles. Fray Juan Crespi, one of two Franciscan missionaries traveling with Portolá, named it el río de Nuestra Señora La Reina de Los Ángeles de Porciúncula. Crespi chose that name, because August 15 is the date of the yearly Catholic feast day in honor of the Virgin Mary's Assumption into Heaven and assuming the role as Queen of the Angels, to which the small Portiuncula chapel, where the Franciscan Order began in Assisi, Italy, is dedicated. The river was thereafter referred to as the "Porciuncula River". In later years, the "Los Angeles" part of Crespi's lengthy name won out.

Possession by the United States 

Control of California, along with the rest of the northern part of the republic of Mexico, was wrested by the United States in the Mexican-American War (1846-1848). California became a state in 1850, and the Los Angeles area began to boom the following year. Generations of settlers and city managers drained, rerouted, polluted and overpopulated the river and its watershed. 

The river was originally an alluvial river that ran freely across a flood plain that is now occupied by Los Angeles, Long Beach, and other townships in Southern California. Its path was unstable and unpredictable, and the mouth of the river moved frequently from one place to another between Long Beach and Ballona Creek. Floods damaged extensive amounts of farmland, destroying houses and killing people and livestock. Severe flooding has encouraged those living near the river to adapt and construct further away from the river in order to prevent loss from flooding. In the early 19th century, the river turned southwest after leaving the Glendale Narrows, where it joined Ballona Creek and discharged into Santa Monica Bay in present Marina del Rey. However, this account is challenged by Col. J. J. Warner, in his Historical Sketch of Los Angeles County:"...until 1825 it was seldom, if in any year, that the river discharged even during the rainy season its waters into the sea. Instead of having a river way to the sea, the waters spread over the country, filling the depressions in the surface and forming lakes, ponds and marshes. The river water, if any, that reached the ocean drained off from the land at so many places, and in such small volumes, that no channel existed until the flood of 1825, which, by cutting a river way to tide water, drained the marsh land and caused the forests to disappear."The river was long joined by the San Gabriel River in present-day Long Beach, but in the Great Flood of 1862, the San Gabriel carved out a new course  to the east, and has discharged into Alamitos Bay ever since. The arrival of the railroad accelerated the advancement in urbanization, as various government bodies subdued the river by reducing its flow. Until the 1900's the river was known to supply enough water to incorporate a system of wells to be built in order to supply freshwater to the city.

20th century 

The Los Angeles Aqueduct was opened in 1913 The heavy flow of the Los Angeles River presented many issues, as it began to get exploited as a sewer system. Along with these uses, populations surrounding the river often tossed feces and waste into the river, along with dead dogs and horses (occasional human dead), in hopes that they would get washed down stream and released to the open ocean waters.

War on Water Rights 

In the early 1920s, the Los Angeles Department of Water and Power) (led by the Los Angeles Board of Water and Power Commissioners) negotiated and gradually purchased almost all of Owens Valley farms and their corresponding water rights. The farmers with the most water banded together to form the Owens Valley Irrigation District in order to try to secure a better deal. When the Owens Valley Irrigation District did not succeed, they created three smaller groups in order to try to bargain. These groups were turbulent in their efforts; resorting to violence, trying to get the attention of state and national press, and calling for politician interference to support their demands for more compensation. This conflict was so highly disputed that the national press referred to it as "California's Little Civil War."

The St. Francis Dam was built starting in 1924 (and through 1926), leading to the creation of a large reservoir in San Francisquito Canyon, and provided water for Los Angeles. However, the dam collapsed in 1928. Following the collapse of the dam, there was little appetite for large dams near the homes of Los Angeles' residents.

The 1930s in particular saw rapid urban development in areas prone to river flooding. Despite smaller mitigation efforts than the St. Francis Dam, unpredictable and devastating floods continued to plague it well into the 1930s, including:

 Crescenta Valley flood (1933 and 1934) - a flood on New Year's Eve and New Year's Day devastated the communities of La Crescenta, Montrose, La Cañada, and Tujunga.
 Los Angeles Flood of 1938 - This flood precipitated the recall of then-mayor of Los Angeles Frank L. Shaw), leading to calls for flood control measures. 

The incidents revolving around the Los Angeles River resulted in the Army Corps of Engineers blocking its path through a cement wall. The Army Corps of Engineers duly began an ambitious project of completely encasing the river's bed and banks in concrete, with only a trickle of water usually flowing down its middle. The only portions of the river that are not completely paved over are in the flood-control basin behind the Sepulveda Dam near Van Nuys; an 11-mile (17.7-km) stretch east of Griffith Park known as the Glendale Narrows; and along its last few miles in Long Beach.

After World War II 
The river was dry for nine months of the year as late as the 1950s. According to an August 2013 article in the Los Angeles Times, the water in the river today is largely "industrial and residential discharge," which originates from the "two giant pipes that collect the sewage from the homes of 800,000 San Fernando Valley residents" that lead to the Tillman Water Reclamation Plant, "before crashing over a man-made waterfall into Lake Balboa. That body of water, along with two smaller ones, puts 23 million gallons of water a day into the river at Sepulveda Basin."

Despite the heavy flood flows of the river during winter months, the LA river has become a refuge for marginalized communities, such as migrant, homeless, and diverse sociocultural communities. For a time, the river itself was a geographical divide between East L.A., which is largely Latino, and predominantly white, wealthy West L.A. These minority groups established themselves along the banks of the river, using fish for food. A distinguished link between the LA river and marginalization can be seen through time as a 1909 New York Times article describes these communities as poor transient communities that consume diseased fish to sustain themselves. The years following the Mexican-American war exemplify these efforts, as articles depict African-American children fishing in the river alongside a "hobo" camp and junkyard.

Remediation efforts in order to tame the river along with the construction of highways in the 1950s and 1960s displaced hundreds of thousands of individuals. These implications lead to poor air quality and increased exposure to diseases that inhibit good health.

In 1983, tensions were at an all time high between Los Angeles county and the citizens of Owens Valley. During this time, the ground water and runoff from Owens Valley comprised eight and sixty-five percent, respectively, of Los Angeles' water supply. The large consumption of water from Owens Valley led to damaging drying of the valley's ecosystem. The residents of Owens Valley tried to uprise against L.A. county, but to no avail.

Points of interest
Sepulveda Basin is a flood-control basin to manage floodwater runoff. Except for infrequent but dramatic flood episodes, this dry-land flood control basin, most of which is leased from the Corps by the City of Los Angeles Department of Recreation and Parks, plays host to diverse uses today including athletic fields, agriculture, golf courses, a fishing lake, parklands, a sewage treatment facility, and a wildlife reserve.

The Los Angeles River bicycle path runs through the Glendale Narrows and is accessible to the public at its north end at Riverside Drive, at Los Feliz Boulevard, and at its south end at Glendale Boulevard, Fletcher Drive and at Egret Park in Elysian Valley. The bike path runs parallel to the 5 freeway for the majority of its length and has mile markers and call boxes for information and safety purposes.

Rio de Los Angeles State Park is north of downtown Los Angeles in the neighborhood of Cypress Park on the east bank of the river. The  park includes restored wetlands featuring native plants as well as recreational activities.

The river's southern stretch forms the heart of an industrial corridor, stretching nearly unbroken from Lincoln Heights to Long Beach. In this area, the busy Long Beach Freeway (I-710) and several high-voltage power lines run within a few hundred feet of the riverbed. Several rail yards are located along the river's banks in this stretch, as well. Just outside the industrial corridor lie some of the most densely populated cities in the state of California, such as the cities of Bell, Bell Gardens, Cudahy, Maywood and South Gate; most of these cities are in the river's flood plain and experienced significant flooding prior to channelization.

River parks
List of parks, trails and bike paths adjacent to the L.A. River and tributaries:

 Glendale Narrows Elysian Valley Bike Path
 North Valleyheart Riverwalk
 Griffith Park
 Arroyo Seco Bike Path and Kenneth Newell Bikeway
 LARIO
 Tujunga Wash Greenway
 Browns Creek Bike Path
 Whittier Narrows Recreation Area
 Rio Hondo Bike Path
 Hahamongna Watershed Park
 Cudahy River Park
 Marsh Park
 Sunnynook River
 Maywood Riverfront Park
 Zev Yaroslavsky L.A. River Greenway Trail
 Los Angeles Riverfront Park and Pathway
 Los Angeles River Center and Gardens

Wildlife

Historically, the native species of fish in the Los Angeles River included rainbow/steelhead trout (Oncorhynchus mykiss), river shrimp, Chinook salmon (Oncorhynchus tshawytscha), Sacramento pikeminnow (Ptychocheilus grandis), Pacific lamprey, three-spined stickleback, and Santa Ana sucker. In 1877 Archduke Ludwig Salvator of Austria published a book about his 1876 visit to Los Angeles, entitled Los Angeles in Südcalifornien. Eine Blume aus dem goldenen Land (Los Angeles in Southern California. A Flower from the Golden Land) which included a description of the fish in the Los Angeles River: "“the salmon, Quinnat salmon (Salmo quinnat), abundant between November and June; two kinds of trout, the brook trout (Salar iridea); and the salmon trout (Ptychocheilus grandis).” These three species are known today as the Chinook salmon, steelhead/rainbow trout, and Sacramento pikeminnow. The native species of the Los Angeles River were extirpated by the conversion of the natural riverbed into a concrete trapezoidal channel in 1938. The last known native species to be caught in the river was a rainbow trout in 1940 by a local fisherman.

There is an abundance today of non-native fish species in the Los Angeles River which include common carp, largemouth bass, tilapia, green sunfish, Amazon sailfin catfish, bluegill, black bullhead, brown bullhead, channel catfish, fathead minnow, crayfish, and mosquito fish. However, Arroyo chub, which was once thought gone since the channelization, has made small appearances throughout parts of the Los Angeles River, Most recent being in the area of Balboa Lake/Anthony C. Beilenson Park in the surrounding channels such as Bull Creek, Woodley Creek and around the creeks and main body of the Sepulveda Basin Wildlife Reserve.

There is also a large variety of bird species in the Los Angeles River which include snowy egret, great egret black-necked stilt, great blue heron, green heron, mallard, cinnamon teal, American coot, Muscovy duck, white pelican, Canada goose, osprey, California high desert mourning dove, black-chinned hummingbird, barn owl, and red tailed hawk. All of these species either nest or live off of the resources of the river.
Before the river's channelization the river supported a variety of mammals which included the California golden bear (removed 1897), grey wolf (removed 1890s), coyote, mule deer, and North American beaver.

There is indirect evidence that North American beaver (Castor canadensis) were native to the river, as the Beñemé (Mojave) and Jeniguechi (San Jacinto branch of the Cahuilla) Indians of the San Gabriel Mission were described by Father Pedro Font on the second de Anza Expedition in 1776, "The costume of the men in heathendom is total nakedness, while the women wear a bit of deer skin with which they cover themselves, and likewise an occasional cloak of beaver or rabbit skin, although the fathers endeavor to clothe the converted Indians with something as best they can." The Tongva or Gabrieleño Indians of Mission San Gabriel had a word for beaver To-le-vah-che.

Revitalization

The ongoing efforts to revitalize the river began in earnest in approximately 2002. A number of city and county departments, committees and non-profit organizations have led the revitalization efforts. Since the 1938 floods and the subsequent concreting of the river channel, actual restoration of the River to its natural state is no longer possible or necessarily desirable, in most of the 51 mile river, lest new flooding occur.

Studies in the 1980s included a freeway to be used during the dry season to alleviate traffic congestion, and use as a path for hovercraft.

In 2011, the creation of the L.A. River Recreation Zone legalized recreational use in the area. Since then, there have been countless projects to restore recreational use, including a 2.5 mile section of the Glendale Narrows that opened to the public for unrestricted recreational use between Memorial Day and Labor Day in 2013. In May 2014 it was announced that two sections of the river would again be open for recreational use during the summer.

The Los Angeles City Council formed an ad hoc committee in 2002 to focus on accessing and revitalizing the river that was chaired by Councilmember Ed Reyes. The California Coastal Conservancy, a state agency, published its Los Angeles River Park and Recreation Study in 1993, identifying potential projects along the river. In 2006, Los Angeles Mayor Villaraigosa visited South Korea to look at their river restoration project for the Cheonggyecheon.

As a result of the Ad Hoc River Committee's efforts, and with funding from the Los Angeles Department of Water and Power, the City of Los Angeles’ Department of Public Works - Bureau of Engineering issued a request for proposals in 2005 for the preparation of a Revitalization Master Plan, which would identify proposals that would make the Los Angeles River a "front door" to the City, and support civic activities. The city's Los Angeles River Revitalization Master Plan was adopted in 2007.

One of the key recommendations made by the master plan was the establishment of a non-profit development corporation, with a board appointed by the then Mayor Antonio Villaraigosa and certain members of L.A. City Council, to carry out many of its recommended projects. In September 2009, the first board meeting of the LA River Revitalization Corporation was held. Startup funding was provided by the CRA. Harry B. Chandler was elected first chair of the board, and Omar Brownson was hired in 2010 to be the founding Executive Director. The first development project undertaken by LARRC was creating a public-private partnership to create the first pedestrian, bike and equestrian bridge across the river. Developer Mort La Kretz provided the seed financing for the bridge, which was built next to the 5 freeway in the Elysian Valley by the Los Angeles Bureau of Engineering and completed in 2020.

On July 23, 2013, the LARRC announced a goal of completing a continuous 51-mile (82 km) greenway and bike path along the river by the end of the decade. The path is envisioned to be the central focus of a linear recreational park as well as providing an alternative transportation path through Los Angeles.

The Los Angeles Times first reported in 2015 that the renowned architect Frank Gehry was collaborating with the LARRC (whose name was changed to River LA). In 2017, Gehry Partners and River LA produced an informational database on the River known as the LA River Index.

In 2018, the County of Los Angeles opted to update their River Masterplan. Geosyntec was hired to lead the effort, with Gehry Partners, RiverLA and OLIN taking on additional responsibilities. In 2019, Gehry revealed to Alta Magazine that he is working on designing several projects along the River, including a cultural center in Southgate.

On September 13, 2013, the Army Corps of Engineers recommended a $453 million plan to restore nearly 600 acres of wildlife habitat – much of that located between Griffith Park and Lincoln Heights – as the best option to restore the river's ecosystem while preserving the flood protection provided by the concrete encasement. Subsequently, all Federal funding for the plan has been on hold. In early 2016, there was some dispute as to federal funding for river cleanup after winter storms. As part of Proposition 68 in California in June 2018, later that year, grants were given for the cleanup of invasive plants along part of the river. As a result, in 2018, Los Angeles and its LARiverWorks policy team had a project underway for "every mile of the river within city limits, aiming to improve connectivity, increase open space, and restore habitat. New bridges and trails will accommodate people on foot, bikes, or horseback." Plans to cleanup 11 miles of river north of downtown Los Angeles, in the hopes of attracting steelhead trout, will cost $1.1 billion. In February 2019, the Los Angeles County Flood Control District was informing the federal government that it wanted to take control of about 40 miles of channels owned by the U.S. Army Corps of Engineers.

Revitalization Inequity and Concerns 
In Los Angeles, low-income and poverty-stricken areas, along with areas that have predominantly Latino, African American, and Asian-Pacific Islander communities have drastically less access to open spaces and parks. Many existing green spaces are unequal in distribution, access, quality, and safety.

One concern in revitalizing the Los Angeles River is neighborhood gentrification and its effects on the surrounding communities. Urban greening, whilst making the land more attractive and environmentally friendly, also regularly promotes neighborhood gentrification and reinforces consumer culture. This then adds to the vast network of environmental injustices on these local communities, primarily through physical displacement.

Similar Revitalization Efforts 
Many similar revitalization efforts have led to increased beautification and greening.

In Gowanus, New York, a canal that was ignored for decades until it was recently revitalized as an environmental public space. The area was home to low and middle-class citizens and diverse sociocultural groups, but since the area has been greened, many of these communities have been forced to relocate due to heightened living expenses caused by gentrification of the area.

Similarly, communities living on the Greenpoint-Williamsburg waterfront agreed to increasing luxury property in the area in exchange for green space, public access, and affordable housing. A decade later, several luxury towers have been created, yet the green space was deemed too expensive to incorporate and the affordable housing has not been built.

The 2020 LA River Master Plan 
In 2020, Los Angeles County released an updated 2020 LA River Master Plan detailing plans for the river over the next 25 years. The current plan addresses 9 goals related to flood risk, parks, ecosystems, access, arts and culture, housing, engagement and education, water supply, and water quality. The plan for decreasing flood risk consists of preserving and increasing flood risk capacity, reducing flow into the river, incorporating climate change research, and increasing emergency planning, public awareness, and management practices. In order to create inclusive, open areas, LA county's actions include making 51 continuous miles of open space, finishing the LA River Trail, providing amenities, implementing multi-use functionality, and promoting public safety. The third goal of the 2020 LA River Master Plan is to support flourishing ecosystems by increasing habitat and ecosystem function, improve plant biodiversity including native species, connecting habitat to support wildlife, and increasing environmentally-friendly practices. The LA county goal of equal access to the river is outlined by creating access points and gateways and promoting safe transportation to the river. The objective of enhancing arts and culture is planned to be achieved by creating a 51-mile arts and culture corridor, identifying and supporting cultures, and involving artists and cultural groups in the design process. The next goal outlined in the LA River Master Plan addresses impacts to the housing economy and the homeless community through incorporating the Affordable Housing Coordinating Committee in planning, creating mapping and assessment tools, increasing affordable housing, securing funding, and enhancing outreach to homeless populations. The actions to enhance engagement and education include providing spaces for all ages to learn, developing new educational materials, involving aspects from indigenous peoples, and promoting the river as an economic asset to nearby communities. The eighth goal in the master plan is to improve water supply through diverting and treating stormwater and dry weather flows before they flow into the river, supporting efficient water usage, creating better operations, maintenance, and measures. The final goal is to improve water quality by developing water quality projects, working with watershed management groups, raising public awareness, and improving facility operations and maintenance.

Friends of the Los Angeles River 

Friends of the Los Angeles River (FoLAR) was founded in 1986 by poet and activist Lewis P. Macadams. Originally deemed a "40-year artwork to bring the River back to life," FoLAR was the first organization advocating for habitat restoration and public access on the LA River.

One FoLAR's more prominent ongoing projects is the annual Great LA River Cleanup, which began in 1988 with a group of less than twenty people. In 2017, the Great LA Cleanup had up to 10,000 volunteers over three weekends covering the upper, middle, and lower sections of the River. In 2016, an estimated 5,000 volunteers took place in the annual cleanup, including the mayor and several elected officials. In 2018, more than 6,000 volunteers removed more than 60 tons of trash at nine sites along the Los Angeles River. In 2019, the FoLAR cleanup was the largest river cleanup in the United States. The cleanup marked 30 years in 2019. By the summer of 2019, kayaking in Los Angeles in the river had become common. As of 2018, FoLAR has adopted a year-round cleanup model through partnerships with other environmental organizations like Heal the Bay, and through service opportunities for corporate groups and large organizations through River Makers program.

In 2012, FoLAR raised a $1 million donation to support the completion of the ARBOR study by the United States Army Corps of Engineers (USACE). This study ultimately resulted in the adoption of Alternative 20, a restoration plan focused on 719 acres of habitat and pedestrian-friendly improvements, among other things.

Riverside communities 

Communities and cities along the banks of the Los Angeles River include:

 Canoga Park
 Winnetka
 Reseda
 Encino
 Lake Balboa
 Van Nuys
 Sherman Oaks
 Studio City
 Universal City
 Toluca Lake
 Burbank
 Glendale
 Los Feliz
 Atwater Village
 Elysian Valley
 Glassell Park
 Cypress Park
 Chinatown
 Lincoln Heights
 Boyle Heights
 Vernon
 East Los Angeles
 South Central Los Angeles
 Maywood
 Commerce
 Bell
 Bell Gardens
 Cudahy
 South Gate
 Lynwood
 Paramount
 Compton
 Long Beach

Crossings

Entertainment setting 

Numerous films, television programs, music videos, commercials and video games have featured various sites along the Los Angeles River. Since the River is a trickle for much of the year and the culvert is dry, it is often used as a setting for races, car chases, gang rumbles, and other scenes requiring an open, deserted setting within the city.

The following have scenes filmed or set within the culvert:

 24
 All Quiet On The Western Front
 Ambulance
 Blood In Blood Out
 Blue Thunder
 Chinatown
 Cleopatra Jones
 Deadline Auto Theft
 Double Nickels
 Drive
 Earthquake
 Fear the Walking Dead
 Freaky Friday
 Gangster Squad
 Girls Town
 Gleaming the Cube
 Gone in 60 Seconds and its loose remake
 Grease
 Harley Davidson and the Marlboro Man
 I Got The Hook Up
 In Time
 Into The Wild
 It's Alive
 L.A. Story
 Last Action Hero
 Point Blank
 Point Break
 Repo Man
 Roadblock
 Terminator 2: Judgment Day
 The Adventures of Buckaroo Banzai Across the 8th Dimension
 The Blue Knight
 The Core
 The Dark Knight Rises
 The Gumball Rally
 The Italian Job
 The Junkman
 The Bad Guys
 Them!
 To Live and Die in L.A.
 Transformers

The river is featured in Visiting... with Huell Howser Episode 218.

TV series highlighting the river include The Beverly Hillbillies, Knight Rider , CHiPs, Terminator: The Sarah Connor Chronicles, American Horror Story: Apocalypse, the fifteenth season of The Amazing Race, as well as the seventh, sixteenth season of Hell's Kitchen, and The Stranger. Music videos incorporating the location include Kanye West's "Jesus Walks," Maroon 5's "Wake Up Call,", Good Charlotte's "The River" and Cheryl's "Call My Name".

Video games include the racing game series Midnight Club with Midnight Club 2 and Midnight Club: Los Angeles and the action-adventure games Grand Theft Auto: San Andreas and Grand Theft Auto V (both of which feature depictions of the river within the fictional city of Los Santos).

The house used for exterior shots of Brady's home in the sitcom The Brady Bunch at 11222 North Dilling Street in North Hollywood, has the bank of the river as the edge of its backyard.

Gallery

See also

 List of rivers of California
 List of Los Angeles bike paths

References

Further reading

 The Los Angeles River: Its Life, Death, and Possible Rebirth. Blake Gumprecht. Baltimore and London: Johns Hopkins University Press, 1999. .
 Eden by design: the 1930 Olmsted-Bartholomew plan for the Los Angeles region. Greg Hise & William Francis Deverell. Berkeley: University of California Press, 2000. . .
 Río L.A.: Tales from the Los Angeles River. Patt Morrison. Los Angeles: Angel City Press, 2001. .
 Down By The Los Angeles River: Friends of the Los Angeles River's Official Guide Joe Linton. Berkeley: Wilderness Press, 2005. .
 Hazardous Metropolis: Flooding and Urban Ecology in Los Angeles Jared Orsi. University of California Press, 2004. .

External links

  William Deverell, Whitewashed Adobe: The Rise of Los Angeles and the Remaking of Its Mexican Past, University of California Press, Los Angeles, 2005, Page 102, "Map 2: Changing Courses of the Los Angeles River"
 The Los Angeles River Master Plan
 Los Angeles River Revitalization Master Plan and City Ad Hoc Committee
 The Los Angeles River Tour
 Los Angeles & San Gabriel Rivers Watershed Council
 The River Project
 F.O.L.A.R. Friends of the Los Angeles River
 Friends of the Sepulveda Basin, organization website
 lariverflyfishing River blog from a unique perspective
 lacreekfreak, Blog
 Friends Of Vast Industrial Concrete Kafkaesque Structures, a photo journal of photographs of the Los Angeles River flood control channel.
 The Los Angeles River Film, a 28-minute documentary film about the Los Angeles River including recent revitalization efforts.
 Saving the Los Angeles River, story about saving the river via boating and activism.
 KCET Departures interview with Joe Linton advocate of restoration and revitalization of the L.A. river.
 L.A. River Expeditions, a leading advocate for recreational-educational boating and public access rights on the L.A. River.
 Rock the Boat, an award-winning documentary film featuring the L.A. River and many environmental advocates.
 Environmental Protection Agency, their historic 2010 determination about protecting the entire L.A. River watershed.
 Time magazine article, featuring the 2012 Paddle the L.A. River pilot program.
 CNN article, on the paddling program.
 New York Times article, on the river being opened to recreational use. 
 BBC broadcast, on canoeing to save the river.
 , video capture of the flamingo chase.
 River photos

 
Rivers of Los Angeles County, California
Rivers of Southern California
Geography of Los Angeles
Geography of the San Fernando Valley
San Fernando Valley
South Gate, California